List of railway stations in the United Kingdom, split alphabetically.

UK railway stations – A 
UK railway stations – B 
UK railway stations – C 
UK railway stations – D 
UK railway stations – E 
UK railway stations – F 
UK railway stations – G 
UK railway stations – H 
UK railway stations – I 
UK railway stations – J 
UK railway stations – K 
UK railway stations – L 
UK railway stations – M 
UK railway stations – N 
UK railway stations – O 
UK railway stations – P 
UK railway stations – Q 
UK railway stations – R 
UK railway stations – S 
UK railway stations – T 
UK railway stations – U
UK railway stations – V 
UK railway stations – W 
UK railway stations – Y

See also
 Railway stations built with a special purpose in the United Kingdom
 List of closed railway stations in Britain
 List of heritage railway stations in the United Kingdom
 All the Stations

External links

 List of National Rail Station codes. National Rail Enquiries covers railways in Great Britain only. Stations in Northern Ireland are not listed.